Yeah, But Still was an American podcast hosted by Jack Wagner and Brandon Wardell. The podcast was typically recorded at Wagner's house in Los Angeles, although there have been a few recorded performances at other venues, notably at the Kennedy Center. Yeah, But Still has been covered in the press by Rolling Stone, Paper, and XFDR; Rolling Stone listed Yeah, But Still as part of their "Best New Comedy Podcasts of 2018" list. They praised the podcast for giving a glimpse into the lives of its hosts with an exclusive lens previously only accessible to Hollywood insiders. Paper focused on the comedic value inherent in the unstructured conversations between Wagner and Wardell. XFDR focused on the show's credibility as a source of insider knowledge in the field of popular internet meme culture.

Jack Wagner has practiced investigative journalism in some episodes. One such investigation was featured in the two-part series The Calamari Algorithm which was a probe regarding certain business practices of Dave & Buster's.

Yeah, But Still announced the show will end with Episode 500 via the show's official Twitter account. The final episode aired on March 4, 2023, concluding the podcast.

References

External links 

Comedy and humor podcasts
2018 podcast debuts
Audio podcasts
2023 podcast endings